Dolany is a municipality and village in Klatovy District in the Plzeň Region of the Czech Republic. It has about 1,000 inhabitants.

Administrative parts
Villages of Andělice, Balkovy, Komošín, Malechov, Řakom, Sekrýt, Svrčovec and Výrov are administrative parts of Dolany.

Notable people
Franz von Pitha (1810–1875), Austrian surgeon

Gallery

References

External links

Villages in Klatovy District